A Reading Clerk is a position (often within a governmental organisation) held by a person who carries out duties such as recording attendance and administering oaths.

See Reading Clerk of the United States House of Representatives, House of Lords for examples.

Government occupations